Pierre Mazeaud (born 24 August 1929) is a French jurist, politician and alpinist.

In February 2004, he was appointed president of the Constitutional Council of France by President of France Jacques Chirac, replacing Yves Guéna, until he was succeeded by Jean-Louis Debré in February 2007. He had been a member of the council since February 1998.

Pierre Mazeaud has a doctorate in law from the University of Paris (on marriage and the condition of the married woman in ancient Rome).

From 1961 to 1964, he was a member of the judiciary. In 1976, he became a counsellor in the Council of State, a position from which he retired on 25 August 1995. During the 1970s, he held subordinate governmental positions regarding sports.

Pierre Mazeaud's main hobby is alpinism, which he practiced at high level. On 11 July 1961, Mazeaud and other fellow climbers almost died in the Mont Blanc massif due to an unexpected storm.

On 15 October 1978 he became the first Frenchman to climb Mount Everest together with Jean Afanassieff, Nicolas Jaeger and Kurt Diemberger (from Austria).

See also
List of 20th-century summiters of Mount Everest
List of Mount Everest records

References

External links
 Biography (in French)
 Interview
 Official page

1929 births
Living people
Politicians from Lyon
Union for the New Republic politicians
Union of Democrats for the Republic politicians
Rally for the Republic politicians
Deputies of the 4th National Assembly of the French Fifth Republic
Deputies of the 5th National Assembly of the French Fifth Republic
Deputies of the 8th National Assembly of the French Fifth Republic
Deputies of the 9th National Assembly of the French Fifth Republic
Deputies of the 10th National Assembly of the French Fifth Republic
Deputies of the 11th National Assembly of the French Fifth Republic
20th-century French judges
French mountain climbers
French summiters of Mount Everest
University of Paris alumni
Members of the Conseil d'État (France)
Grand Officiers of the Légion d'honneur
Commanders of the Order of Tahiti Nui